Joseph August Berger (December 20, 1886 – March 6, 1956) was an infielder in Major League Baseball. He played for the Chicago White Sox.

References

External links

1886 births
1956 deaths
Major League Baseball infielders
Chicago White Sox players
Minor league baseball managers
Baseball players from St. Louis
Rock Island Islanders players
Mobile Sea Gulls players
Wichita Jobbers players
Pueblo Indians players
Los Angeles Angels (minor league) players
Venice Tigers players
Vernon Tigers players
Oakland Oaks (baseball) players
Wichita Witches players
Louisville Colonels (minor league) players
Wichita Falls Spudders players
Denver Bears players
Augusta Tygers players